The 2015–16 Korisliiga season was the 76th season of the top professional basketball league in Finland. The season started on October 3, 2015 and ended May 11, 2016. Kouvot won its fourth national championship this season.

Teams

Namika Lahti left the league after the 2014–15 season, because of a bankruptcy. BC Nokia was promoted from the second tier First Division after winning the championship there.

Notes
 Team makes its debut in the Korisliiga.
 Defending champions, winners of the 2014–15 Korisliiga season.

Standings

Playoffs

Quarterfinals

Semifinals

Finals

Attendance
Included only regular season games.

References

Korisliiga seasons
Finnish
Koris